"Douha (Mali Mali)" is a song by the English band Disclosure and Malian singer-songwriter Fatoumata Diawara. It was released as the fifth single from the duo's third studio album Energy on 29 July 2020.

Background
The song is about Diawara's hometown, which is in the lyrics, "When you go to my home country/There is unity in my home-country/There is harmony and love in my home-country/There is brotherhood in my home-country."

In a video shared on Disclosure's YouTube channel approximately two weeks after the song's release, Diawara explains that "douha" means "prayer", and that the song itself is a cry for help on behalf of her country. Mali, a diverse and historically conflict-laden West African republic, underwent a coup d'état just a mere week after the track came out.

Music video
The video shows Diawara and others dancing in places around the globe. Mahaneela, the director, wanted to make the video beautiful and symbolic. The video was filmed in three countries.

Track listing

Credits and personnel
Credits adapted from Tidal.

 Guy Lawrence – producer, composer, lyricist, associated performer, mixer, programming, and studio personnel
 Howard Lawrence – producer, composer, lyricist, associated performer, and programming
 Fatoumata Diawara – composer, lyricist, associated performer, and vocals
 Stuart Hawkes – mastering engineer and studio personnel

Charts

Release history

References

2020 songs
2020 singles
Disclosure (band) songs
Songs about Africa
Songs written by Guy Lawrence
Songs written by Howard Lawrence